Giovanni Battista Alfieri (died 1676) was a Roman Catholic prelate who served as Bishop of Fano (1649–1676).

Biography
Giovanni Battista Alfieri was born in Ostra Vetere, Italy.
On 9 Dec 1649, he was appointed during the papacy of Pope Innocent X as Bishop of Fano.
On 2 Jan 1650, he was consecrated bishop by Marcantonio Franciotti, Cardinal-Priest of Santa Maria della Pace, with Giovanni Battista Rinuccini, Archbishop of Fermo, and Giambattista Spínola (seniore), Archbishop of Acerenza e Matera, serving as co-consecrators.
He served as Bishop of Fano until his death on 17 Sep 1676.

While bishop, he was the principal co-consecrator of Baldassarre Bonifazio, Bishop of Capodistria (1653); and Francesco de Andreis, Bishop of Nona (1653).

References

External links and additional sources
 (for Chronology of Bishops) 
 (for Chronology of Bishops)  

17th-century Italian Roman Catholic bishops
Bishops appointed by Pope Innocent X
1676 deaths